In statistics and econometrics, panel data and longitudinal data are both multi-dimensional data involving measurements over time. Panel data is a subset of longitudinal data where observations are for the same subjects each time.

Time series and cross-sectional data can be thought of as special cases of panel data that are in one dimension only (one panel member or individual for the former, one time point for the latter). A literature search often involves time series, cross-sectional, or panel data. Cross-panel data (CPD) is an innovative yet underappreciated source of information in the mathematical and statistical sciences. CPD stands out from other research methods because it vividly illustrates how independent and dependent variables may shift between countries. This panel data collection allows researchers to examine the connection between variables across several cross-sections and time periods and analyze the results of policy actions in other nations.

A study that uses panel data is called a longitudinal study or panel study.

Example

In the multiple response permutation procedure (MRPP) example above, two datasets with a panel structure are shown and the objective is to test whether there's a significant difference between people in the sample data. Individual characteristics (income, age, sex) are collected for different persons and different years. In the first dataset, two persons (1, 2) are observed every year for three years (2016, 2017, 2018). In the second dataset, three persons (1, 2, 3) are observed two times (person 1), three times (person 2), and one time (person 3), respectively, over three years (2016, 2017, 2018); in particular, person 1 is not observed in year 2018 and person 3 is not observed in 2016 or 2018.

A balanced panel (e.g., the first dataset above) is a dataset in which each panel member (i.e., person) is observed every year.  Consequently, if a balanced panel contains N panel members and T periods, the number of observations (n) in the dataset is necessarily .

An unbalanced panel (e.g., the second dataset above) is a dataset in which at least one panel member is not observed every period.  Therefore, if an unbalanced panel contains N panel members and T periods, then the following strict inequality holds for the number of observations (n) in the dataset: .

Both datasets above are structured in the long format, which is where one row holds one observation per time. Another way to structure panel data would be the wide format where one row represents one observational unit for all points in time (for the example, the wide format would have only two (first example) or three (second example) rows of data with additional columns for each time-varying variable (income, age).

Analysis

A panel has the form

 

A general panel data regression model is written as 
Different assumptions can be made on the precise structure of this general model. Two important models are the fixed effects model and the random effects model.

Consider a generic panel data model:

 

 

If  is unobserved, and correlated with at least one of the independent variables, then it will cause omitted variable bias in a standard OLS regression. However, panel data methods, such as the fixed effects estimator or alternatively, the first-difference estimator can be used to control for it.

If  is not correlated with any of the independent variables, ordinary least squares linear regression methods can be used to yield unbiased and consistent estimates of the regression parameters. However, because  is fixed over time, it will induce serial correlation in the error term of the regression. This means that more efficient estimation techniques are available.

Dynamic panel data

Dynamic panel data describes the case where a lag of the dependent variable is used as regressor:

 

The presence of the lagged dependent variable violates strict exogeneity, that is, endogeneity may occur. The fixed effect estimator and the first differences estimator both rely on the assumption of strict exogeneity. Hence, if  is believed to be correlated with one of the independent variables, an alternative estimation technique must be used. Instrumental variables or GMM techniques are commonly used in this situation, such as the Arellano–Bond estimator.

Data sets which have a panel design

Russia Longitudinal Monitoring Survey (RLMS)
 German Socio-Economic Panel (SOEP)
Household, Income and Labour Dynamics in Australia Survey (HILDA)
British Household Panel Survey (BHPS)
Survey of Family Income and Employment (SoFIE)
Survey of Income and Program Participation (SIPP)
Lifelong Labour Market Database (LLMDB)
Longitudinal Internet Studies for the Social sciences (LISS)
Panel Study of Income Dynamics (PSID)
Korean Labor and Income Panel Study (KLIPS)
China Family Panel Studies (CFPS)
German Family Panel (pairfam)
National Longitudinal Surveys (NLSY)
Labour Force Survey (LFS)
Korean Youth Panel (YP)
Korean Longitudinal Study of Aging (KLoSA)

Data sets which have a multi-dimensional panel design

Notes

References

External links
PSID
KLIPS
pairfam
Korea Employment Survey

 
P
Statistical data types
Mathematical and quantitative methods (economics)